A total penumbral lunar eclipse is a lunar eclipse that occurs when the Moon becomes completely immersed in the penumbral cone of the Earth without touching the umbra.

The path for the Moon to pass within the penumbra and outside the umbra is very narrow. It can only happen on the Earth's northern or southern penumbral edges. In addition, the size of the penumbra is sometimes too small where the Moon enters it to contain the Moon. The width of the Earth's penumbra is determined by the Sun's angular diameter at the time of the eclipse, and the Moon's angular diameter is larger than the Sun over part of its elliptical orbit, depending on whether the eclipse occurs at the nearest (perigee) or farthest point (apogee) in its orbit around the Earth. The majority of the time, the size of the Moon and the size of the Earth's penumbra where the Moon crosses it mean that most eclipses will not be total penumbral in nature.

Frequency 
Total penumbral eclipses constitute a relatively small fraction of lunar eclipses, and the distribution of these events is uneven, occurring between 0 and 9 times per century. The period of this variation is approximately 600 years and also correlates with the frequency of total umbral eclipses and tetrads.

The maximum number in Fred's 5K canon is eight for saros 19. Saros 32 and 132 have seven. Saros 58, 95, and 114 have six.

Saros 114 is the only saros in the canon to have a total of seven total penumbral lunar eclipses that are not all in a row. Likewise, saros 169 has five total penumbral eclipses, but only four of them occur consecutively.

Saros series with multiple consecutive total penumbral eclipses 

This table summarizes which saros series contain four or more consecutive total penumbral eclipses.

Summary frequency of total penumbral, total umbral and tetrad events 501–2500

List of total penumbral lunar eclipse events 1901–2200

See also
Lists of lunar eclipses 
List of 21st-century lunar eclipses
Moon illusion
Orbit of the Moon
Solar eclipse

Notes

References